Ishag Adam Abdalla Mohamed (born 1 January 1999) is a Sudanese professional footballer who plays as a goalkeeper for Al-Hilal Omdurman and the Sudan national football team.

References 

1999 births
Living people
Sudanese footballers
Sudan international footballers
Association football goalkeepers
Al-Hilal Club (Omdurman) players
Al-Ahly Shendi players
2021 Africa Cup of Nations players